Langenes or Langeneset is a village in Kinn Municipality in Vestland county, Norway. It is located on the northeastern side of the island of Vågsøy on the shore of the Sildegapet bay. Norwegian county road 622 runs through the village.

References

Villages in Vestland
Kinn